Rozina (born 12 April 1956) is a Bangladeshi film and television actress. As of 2018, she has performed in over 300 films. She was a prominent actress in the 1980s. She won Bangladesh National Film Awards for the Best Actress and Best Supporting Actress for her roles in the films Jibondhara (1988) and Koshai (1980) respectively. She also starred opposite to Mithun Chakraborty in Anyaay Abichar.

Biography
Rozina was born on 12 April 1956 in Faridpur district, East Pakistan.

She started her career at an early age of 16, in the 1976 film Rajmahal, opposite actor Wasim. Then she paired opposite Wasim in a number of films. Their next film was Rosher Baidani. In 1976, she changed her name from Renu to Rozina. They also acted in the films Zarka and Rajshinghasan.

1981-1990
Rozina started acting in Indian Bengali films. In 1985, Hindi film director Shakti Samanta cast this young actress in his Bengali film Anyay Abichar and its Hindi version Aar Paar in the lead role opposite Mithun Chakraborty. She was the first Bangladeshi actress to be cast as a lead actress in a Bollywood film. The film earned 1.5 crores at the box-office which was the highest grossing Bengali film at that time.

In 1988, she achieved Bangladesh National Film Award for Best Actress for her portrayal in Koshai (1988). She lip-synched several songs by Sabina Yasmin such as "O Amar Rasiya Bandhure", "Ei Mon Tomake Dilam", "Jalpari", and "Chhairo Na Chhairo Na Haat".

1991-2000
Rozina starred in several films of West Bengal as a leading actress in the early 1990s. She often acted opposite Chiranjit, Tapas Paul, Ranjit Mallick etc. Then she started doing character roles such as mother, sister, sister-in-law (boudi). She became irregular after 1993.

2001-2010
Rozina made her comeback in Bangladeshi films with the film Rakkhushi (2004) opposite actor Ferdous Ahmed. She was awarded Meril Prothom Alo Awards in Critics Choice Best Film Actress category for her role. She played an insane woman in this film and killed several people to take revenge of her husband's murder. Ferdous was 12–13 years younger than her. It was the first time in Bangladeshi films that an actress worked opposite any actor younger than her by more than a decade.

2011-present
Rozina has appeared in several films as character artists in the 2010s opposite Alamgir and others. She directed two serials titled Mejdidi and Borodidi based on Sharat Chandra Chattopadhyay's novels. Besides directing, she played the title role in Mejdidi. She also directed a drama titled Badnam based on Rabindranath Tagore's story. Additionally, she made several TV dramas based on Kazi Nazrul Islam's story.

Filmography

Awards and recognition
National Film Awards
 Best Actress - Koshai (1988 )
Meril Prothom Alo Awards
 Critics Choice Best Film Actress - Rakkhushi (2004)

References

External links
 

 

Living people
1956 births
People from Faridpur District
Bangladeshi film actresses
Actresses in Bengali cinema
Actresses in Hindi cinema
Bangladeshi expatriate actresses in India
Best Actress National Film Awards (Bangladesh) winners
Best Actress Bachsas Award winners
Best Supporting Actress National Film Award (Bangladesh) winners
20th-century Bangladeshi actresses
21st-century Bangladeshi actresses